State Route 148 (SR 148) is a  state highway that serves as an east–west connector between Sylacauga and Millersville through Clay and Talladega counties. SR 148 intersects SR 21 at its western terminus and SR 9 at its eastern terminus.

Route description
SR 148 begins at an intersection with SR 21 in the central business district of Sylacauga. From this point, SR 148 follows a meandering easterly route through the Talladega National Forest en route to its eastern terminus at SR 9 in Millerville.

Major intersections

See also

References

148
Transportation in Talladega County, Alabama
Transportation in Clay County, Alabama